Sugat ng Kahapon ( is a 2009 Philippine television drama special broadcast by GMA Network. Directed by Mac Alejandre, it stars Dennis Trillo and Marian Rivera. It premiered on April 11, 2009 as part of the lenten presentation of the variety show Eat Bulaga!.

Cast and characters

Lead cast
 Marian Rivera as Hilda 
 Dennis Trillo as Sonny

Supporting cast
 Gardo Versoza as Aldo
 Perla Bautista as Salve
 BJ Forbes as young Sonny

Ratings
According to AGB Nielsen Philippines' Mega Manila households, Sugat ng Kahapon earned a 28.7% rating.

References

GMA Network drama series
Television series by APT Entertainment